David Schneider (born August 24, 1979 in Chicago, United States) is a former professional ice hockey player. He was most recently a defenseman for HC Ambrì-Piotta in Nationalliga A.  David currently works on Wall Street as an institutional equity advisor.

Schneider started his career at Princeton University in the NCAA where he played during the period 1998-2002. In 2002, he left for the Trenton Titans in the ECHL, thus starting his professional hockey career. After only 28 games, Schnieder moved to Finnish side Lukko Rauma in the SM-liiga but played only nine games due to a groin injury. David is married to Stephanie, and has two boys, Luke and Evan.

Career statistics

References

External links

1979 births
Djurgårdens IF Hockey players
Norfolk Admirals players
Living people
Ice hockey players from Illinois
American men's ice hockey defensemen
Trenton Devils players
Princeton Tigers men's ice hockey players